The 1998 Petit Le Mans was the seventh race for the 1998 IMSA GT Championship season, then known as the Professional SportsCar Racing series.  It also served as a prelude to the first American Le Mans Series race held at Sebring in 1999. Don Panoz's American Le Mans Series was developed with the backing of the Automobile Club de l'Ouest (ACO), the ruling body of the 24 Hours of Le Mans.  It took place on October 11, 1998.

Development
Following the demise of the World Sportscar Championship in 1992, sportscar racing was left without a major worldwide series in which to compete.  The 24 Hours of Le Mans remained a remnant, still competed by a large number of sportscars, but mostly on a single race basis.  Various sportscar leagues had sprung up since the WSC's demise, including the International Motor Sports Association's replacement for their Camel GTP series, the Prototype SportsCar Racing series.  In Europe, two series were also developed, the FIA Sportscar Championship and the FIA GT Championship, although they were not combined like IMSA's series.

The Automobile Club de l'Ouest, wanting to create a new worldwide series, made an agreement with Don Panoz, owner of the Road Atlanta racing course. The ACO would agree to lend the Le Mans name out to Panoz for the creation of an event called the Petit Le Mans (French for little Le Mans). The race would be similar to the 12 Hours of Sebring, in that it did not run a full 24 hours like Le Mans. The series would become an experiment for the ACO, in which if enough teams showed interest in Petit Le Mans, the ACO would look into developing a series around the same formula. In order to help drive interest, the ACO promised that the winners of Petit Le Mans would earn automatic invitations to the 24 Hours of Le Mans without having to apply or earn favor with the ACO. This custom continues to be utilized in the Petit Le Mans, despite American Le Mans Series champions also receiving invites.

IMSA, which normally ran at Road Atlanta during their seasons, agreed to allow a joint race for their series and the 24 Hours of Le Mans competitors.  However, each series ran slightly different formulas for their competitors, thus forcing the organizers to create seven different classes.  LMP1, LMGT1, and LMGT2 for the ACO compliant cars, and WSC, GT1, GT2, and GT3 for IMSA's competitors.  Even though both organizers used the GT1 and GT2 names the classes were not actually the same, which is why the ACO classes are preceded by LM.

Official results
Class winners in bold.

Statistics
 Pole Position - Allan McNish (#26 Porsche AG) - 1:13.754
 Fastest Lap - Allan McNish (#26 Porsche AG) - 1:15.239 
 Average Speed - 164.62 km/h

Post-Race
With a total of 31 entrants, including a large number of European teams, the ACO considered the race a success. The only downside was that BMW, who had initially entered their V8-powered Riley & Scott Mk IIIs, did not show up for the race.  That car tested after the race, alongside the new Lola B98/10. The ACO and Don Panoz pushed ahead with their plans and announced the American Le Mans Series for 1999.  IMSA, whose own racing series was faltering, decided to take instead take over as sanctioning body for the new American Le Mans Series.

The #26 Porsche 911 GT1, which had won the pole position for the race, did not finish the race; the car, piloted by Yannick Dalmas, infamously flipped in a blowover between turns 8 and 9.  This incident, as well as similar blowover incidents to the BMW V12 LMR during the 2000 Petit Le Mans and the Mercedes-Benz CLR during the 1999 24 Hours of Le Mans, resulted in Champion Racing not racing a GT1-98 and new regulations introduced in 2004 that changed the cars' geometry and reduced the chance of blow-overs.

The ACO would repeat later this kind of one-off experimental race in preparation for new series, with the 1999 Le Mans Fuji 1000km, the 2000 Race of a Thousand Years, the 2003 1000km of Le Mans and the 2009 1000 km of Okayama.

References

External links
 1998 Petit Le Mans results (WSRP)
 1998 Petit Le Mans results (WSPR-Racing)
 1998 Petit Le Mans Photos and News 

Petit Le Mans
Petit Le Mans